Sweden competed at the 1932 Summer Olympics in Los Angeles, United States. 81 competitors, 78 men and 3 women, took part in 51 events in 12 sports.

Medalists
The following Swedish athletes won medals at the games.

Athletics

Boxing

Cycling

Four cyclists, all men, represented Sweden in 1932.

Individual road race
 Bernhard Britz
 Sven Höglund
 Arne Berg
 Folke Nilsson

Team road race
 Bernhard Britz
 Sven Höglund
 Arne Berg

Diving

Equestrianism

Fencing

Three fencers, all men, represented Sweden in 1932.

Men's épée
 Stig Lindström
 Bo Lindman
 Sven Thofelt

Modern pentathlon

Three male pentathletes represented Sweden in 1932.

 Johan Oxenstierna
 Bo Lindman
 Sven Thofelt

Sailing

Shooting

Three shooters represented Sweden in 1932 with Bertil Rönnmark winning a gold medal.

50 m rifle, prone

 Bertil Rönnmark
 Gustaf Andersson
 Karl August Larsson

Swimming

Wrestling

Art competitions

References

Nations at the 1932 Summer Olympics
1932
1932 in Swedish sport